The Bras de la Rivière Ouelle (in English: Arm of the Ouelle River) is a tributary of the Ouelle River, flowing entirely in the municipality of Tourville, in the L'Islet Regional County Municipality, in the administrative region of Chaudière-Appalaches, in province of Quebec, in Canada.

Geography 
The arm of the Ouelle River has its source at Lake Therrien (lengthː ; altitudeː ), in the canton of Fournier, in the western part of the municipality of Tourville, in the Notre Dame Mountains. The Canadian National railroad runs on the northwest shore of the lake. The resort is developed on the north shore of the lake.

  towards the northeast, following more or less the course of the railway, until the outlet of the lake of Athacas (coming from the northwest);
  towards the northeast, until its confluence where it flows into the Ouelle River (coming from the south).

The Rang John road bridge spans the Ouelle River and the confluence of the Ouelle River arm is located near the bridge (northwest side).

Toponym 
The origin of the toponym arm of the Ouelle River derives from the name of the Ouelle river.

The toponym "R. Hoel" appears on a map designed by Jean Bourdon around 1641 to designate the Ouelle river. This designation of origin evokes Louis Houël, Sieur du Petit-Pré, controller of the salt works of Brouage, member of the Compagnie des Cent-Associés and secretary to the king. Friend and protector of Samuel de Champlain, Houël wintered in Quebec in 1640–1641. He was one of the main instigators of the Récollets coming to New France.

The map drawn up by Jean Deshayes of 1695 bears the modern spelling of the Ouelle river.

The toponym "arm of the Ouelle River" was formalized on December 5, 1968, by the Commission de toponymie du Québec.

See also 
 List of rivers of Quebec

References 

Rivers of Chaudière-Appalaches
L'Islet Regional County Municipality